Tell Ain Cerif is an archaeological site  north northwest of Rayak in the Beqaa Mohafazat (Governorate), Lebanon. It dates at least to the Chalcolithic.

References

Baalbek District
Chalcolithic sites of Asia
Archaeological sites in Lebanon
Great Rift Valley